The following are lists of DC Comics publications:

List of current DC Comics publications
List of DC Comics publications (A–B)
List of DC Comics publications (C–F)
List of DC Comics publications (G–J)
List of DC Comics publications (K–O)
List of DC Comics publications (P–S)
List of DC Comics publications (T–Z)

Publications